Class M7 is a type of diesel-electric locomotive built for Sri Lanka Railways by Brush Traction, UK, and imported in 1981. This locomotive has the shortest length, least power and least weight compared to other diesel locomotives of Sri Lanka.

History

Three locomotives (803, 813, 814) were painted in a special color scheme and later was painted in normal livery.

In 1999 M7 locomotive No. 803 met with an accident and was seriously damaged. 803 is a non runner,

Usage 
This locomotive was introduced as a shunter by the manufacturer, Brush Traction. In Sri Lanka, these are mostly used in short passenger services. M7s are not permitted on the Main Line because of the low power and lack of dynamic braking but it can be run on all the other of the railway lines in Sri Lanka including the Kelani Valley Line.

Gallery

References 

Diesel-electric locomotives of Sri Lanka
Railway locomotives introduced in 1981
5 ft 6 in gauge locomotives